Mary Patricia Anderson (17 March 1887 – 18 February 1966) was one of the first two women appointed to the New Zealand Legislative Council (upper house).

Early life 
Anderson was born in 1887 at Moonlight, one of eight children. She was from Greymouth.

Political career 
She was a founding member of the Greymouth branch of the New Zealand Labour Party. She was then secretary of the branch from 1918 to 1956.

With Mary Dreaver she was appointed to the council on 31 January 1946 by the First Labour Government, after a law change in 1941 to make women eligible to serve on the council. They served to the end of 1950, when the Legislative Council was abolished by the First National Government.

Life after politics 
In 1950 she was elected to the Grey Hospital Board. She served on the Board for 12 years.

She died at Greymouth in 1966; she had never married.

References 

1887 births
1966 deaths
Members of the New Zealand Legislative Council
Women members of the New Zealand Legislative Council
New Zealand Labour Party MLCs
People from Greymouth
20th-century  New Zealand women politicians
20th-century New Zealand politicians
Members of district health boards in New Zealand
New Zealand people of Irish descent
New Zealand people of Swedish descent